A bored cylindrical lock is a lockset which is installed by boring two circular holes in the door. Door handles may also use the same installation.

Installation

Two holes are bored, perpendicular to one another, into the door. The "face bore" is the larger hole which is bored into the door face and a smaller "edge bore" hole is bored into the door edge. The edge may require additional preparation to receive the latch assembly, typically by routing or chiseling a shallow mortise. Some commercially-sold doors may come prepared to receive one or more bored cylindrical locks, such as entry doors, which typically require both a door knob and dead bolt.

This distance is referred to as the "backset." Residential doors are normally prepared with a  backset and commercial doors have a  backset. The edge bore is typically centered on the edge.

History
The cylindrical lock was invented by the German-born engineer Walter Schlage in 1923. The bored cylindrical lock arose from a need for a more cost-effective method of locking doors. The previous norm (still the norm in Europe), the mortise lock, is a more complex device, and its higher manufacturing cost as well as its more labor-intensive installation make the bored cylindrical lock an ideal substitute, both in price and functionality. Because the mortise lock has a larger lock case, a larger and more complex volume must be removed from the door before it can be installed, but the mortise lock may offer additional functions compared to a cylindrical lock; for instance, the mortise lock may include a deadbolt in a single unit, while the cylindrical lock would require separate face bores for a deadbolt and doorknob. The 1923 patent evolved from an earlier Schlage patent filed in 1920 for a lock whose installation required a face bore and surface rabbet, which simplified door preparation compared to a mortise lock.

Gallery

See also
 Mortise lock

References

Locks (security device)